The following is the list of Memphis Tigers football seasons by Memphis Tigers football program.

Seasons

References

See also
Memphis Tigers football

Lists of college football seasons
Memphis Tigers football seasons